The Battle of the Willows (377) took place at a place called ad Salices ("town by the willows"), or according to Ammianus, a road way-station called Ad Salices ("by the Willows"); probably located within 15 kilometres of Marcianople (modern day Dobrudja, Bulgaria), although its exact location is unknown. Forces from the Western Roman Empire under the command of Richomeres advanced westward, while forces of the eastern Roman Empire under Traianus and Profuturus advanced northward where they joined forces to attack the Goths who had recently rebelled under command of Fritigern. and were laying waste to the northern Balkans.

The only extant description comes from Ammianus who left few details; he gives a lengthy description of the dead and dying, but no information on the number of combatants. At one point the Roman left wing gave way, but it was re-enforced and held. The battle ended with nightfall. The result was a bloody draw with both sides taking many losses; the Goths remained encamped behind their war-wagon circle for over a week after the battle.

See also 
Gothic War (376–382)

Citations

References

 

377
Willows
Willows 377
Willows 377
370s in the Byzantine Empire
the Willows